Incitement to genocide is a crime under international law which prohibits inciting (encouraging) the commission of genocide. An extreme form of hate speech, incitement to genocide is considered an inchoate offense and is theoretically subject to prosecution even if genocide does not occur, although charges have never been brought in an international court without mass violence having occurred. "Direct and public incitement to commit genocide" was forbidden by the Genocide Convention in 1948. Incitement to genocide is often cloaked in metaphor and euphemism and may take many forms beyond direct advocacy, including dehumanization and "accusation in a mirror". Historically, incitement to genocide has played a significant role in the commission of genocide, including the Armenian genocide, the Holocaust and the Rwandan genocide.

Definitions
"Direct and public incitement to commit genocide" is forbidden by the Genocide Convention (1948), Article 3(c). If genocide were to be committed, then incitement could also be prosecuted as complicity in genocide, prohibited in Article 3(e), without the incitement necessarily being direct or public.

Incitement
Incitement means encouraging someone else to commit a crime, in this case genocide. The Genocide Convention is generally interpreted as requiring intent to cause genocide for incitement prosecutions.

"Direct"
"Direct" means that the speech must be both intended and understood as a call to take action against the targeted group, which may be difficult to prove for prosecutors due to cultural and individual differences. Wilson  notes that "direct" does not inherently exclude euphemisms (see below), "if the prosecution can show that the overwhelming majority of listeners understood a euphemistic form of speech as a direct (rather than circuitous, oblique or veiled) call to commit genocide". American genocide scholar Gregory Gordon, noting that most incitement does not take the form of imperative command to kill the target group (see below), recommends that a "glossary of incitement techniques should be woven into judicial pronouncements".

The International Criminal Tribunal for Rwanda and International Criminal Tribunal for the former Yugoslavia came to different conclusions on the prosecution of incitement. According to ICTR, incitement did not require an explicit call for violence against the targeted group or causally connected subsequent violence. ICTY came to the opposite conclusion in Prosecutor v. Kordić, because "hate speech not directly calling for violence... did not rise to the same level of gravity" as crimes against humanity.

"Public"
Incitement is considered "public" "if it is communicated to a number of individuals in a public place or to members of a population at large by such means as the mass media". However, the Genocide Convention never defines the term "public" and it is unclear how the criterion would apply to new technologies, such as Internet-enabled social media. Jean-Bosco Barayagwiza was convicted by the International Criminal Tribunal for Rwanda for speeches made at a roadblock, but on appeal it was ruled that these speeches were not considered public.

Causation
Incitement to genocide is an inchoate crime as it is technically prosecutable even if genocide is never committed. However, Gordon writes that "no international court has ever brought an incitement prosecution in the absence of a subsequent genocide or other directly-related large-scale atrocity". Wilson noted that the judgement against Jean-Paul Akayesu "seemingly elevated causation to a legal requirement to prove incitement" as it stated "there must be proof of a possible causal link" between the alleged incitement and murders. Tribunals asserted that the incitement led to violence, even when this was not conclusively proven by the prosecution.

Davies details four benefits of an inchoate and separate approach to prosecuting incitement, instead of prosecuting incitement as part of the crime of genocide: 

 obviating the difficult task of proving a causal connection between incitement and violence, 
 allowing people to be charged with aiding and abetting incitement, 
 allowing incitement to genocide to be prosecuted even when the resulting violence cannot be proven to have been genocidal (e.g. rather than war crimes or crimes against humanity), and 
 enabling the prevention of genocide by prosecuting incitement thus acting as a deterrent to genocide.

Free speech issues
Defining incitement to genocide is important because it can be in tension with the protection of freedom of expression. In the Léon Mugesera case, a Canadian federal appeals court found that his 1992 speech claiming that Hutus were about to be "exterminated by inyenzi or cockroaches" was protected free speech and that the speech's themes were "elections, courage and love". Subsequently, the Canadian Supreme Court ruled that "reasonable grounds exist to believe that Mr. Mugesera committed a crime against humanity". Some dictators and authoritarian leaders have used overly broad interpretations of "incitement" or speech crimes in order to jail journalists and political opponents.

Gordon argued that the benefits of free speech do not apply in situations where mass violence is occurring because "the 'marketplace of ideas' has been likely shut down or is not functioning properly." Therefore, it is justified to restrict speech that would not ordinarily be punishable. Susan Benesch, a free speech advocate, concedes that free speech provisions are intended to protect private speech while most or all genocide is state-sponsored. Therefore, in her opinion, prosecution of incitement to genocide should take into account the authority of the speaker and whether they are likely to persuade the audience. Richard Ashby Wilson observed that those prosecuted for incitement to genocide and related international crimes "have gone beyond mere insult, libel and slander to incite others to commit mass atrocities. Moreover, their utterances usually occur in a context of an armed conflict, genocide and a widespread or systematic attack on a civilian population."

Alternate definitions
Alternate definitions and interpretations have been proposed by various authors. In Benesch's six-pronged "reasonably probable consequences" test, a finding of incitement to genocide would require violence as a possible consequence of the speech, which is compatible with existing jurisprudence. Carol Pauli's "Communications Research Framework" is intended to define situations where freedom of speech can be justifiably infringed by broadcast interference and other non-judicial measures to prevent genocide. Gordon has argued for "fixing the existing framework" by reinterpreting or changing incitement, direct, public, and causation elements. Gordon favors removing the requirement to be public, because "[p]rivate incitement can be just as lethal, if not more, than public."

Types 
Susan Benesch noted that "Inciters have used strikingly similar techniques before genocide, even in  times  and  places  as  different  as  Nazi  Germany  in  the  1930s  and  Rwanda  in  the  1990s." The following types have been classified by Gordon.

Direct advocacy
Gordon notes that "direct calls for destruction are relatively rare". In May 1939, Nazi propagandist Julius Streicher wrote "A  punitive  expedition  must  come  against the Jews in Russia. A punitive expedition which will provide the same fate for them that every murderer and criminal must expect. Death sentence  and  execution.  The  Jews  in  Russia  must  be  killed.  They  must  be  exterminated  root  and  branch." On 4 June 1994,  Kantano Habimana broadcast from RTLM: "we will kill the Inkotanyi and exterminate them" based on their alleged ethnic characteristics: "Just look at his small nose and then break it".  Gordon considers Iranian president Mahmoud Ahmadinejad's 2005 comments that Israel "must be wiped off the map" an example of direct advocacy.

Predictions
In the Rwandan Media Case, some broadcasts of the Radio Télévision Libre des Mille Collines (RTLM) that "foretold elimination of the inyenzi or cockroaches" were found to constitute incitement  to genocide. An example is the following statement by Ananie Nkurunziza on RTLM on 5 June 1994: "I think we are fast approaching what I would call dawn ... dawn, because—for the young people who may not know— dawn is when the day breaks. Thus when day breaks, when that day comes, we will be heading for a brighter future, for the day when we will be able to say “There isn't a single Inyenzi left in the country.” The term Inyenzi will then be forever forgotten, and disappear for good."

Dehumanization

According to Gordon, "verminization, pathologization, demonization, and other forms of dehumanization" can be considered incitement to genocide. Verminization classifies the target as something "whose extermination would be considered normal and desirable", which is why Hutu leaders frequently described Tutsis as inyenzi (cockroaches). RTLM propagandist Georges Ruggiu pled guilty to incitement to genocide, admitting that calling Tutsis "inyenzi" meant designating them "persons to be killed". Gordon writes that like dehumanization, demonization is "sinister figurative speech but is more phantasmagorical and/ or anthropocentric in nature... [centering] on devils, malefactors, and other nefarious personages." Pathologization means designating the target as a disease. According to genocide scholar Gregory Stanton, this "expropriates pseudo-medical terminology to justify massacre [and it] dehumanizes the victims as sources of filth and disease, [propagating] the reversed social ethics of the perpetrators". Stanton identified dehumanization as third in the eight stages of genocide, noting that "Dehumanization overcomes the normal human revulsion against murder." While Stanton and others have contended that dehumanization is a necessary condition for genocide, Johannes Lang has argued that its role is overstated and that forms of humiliation and torture which occur during genocide occur precisely because the victims' humanity is recognized.

"Accusation in a mirror"

"Accusation in a mirror" is a false claim that accuses the target of something that the perpetrator is doing or intends to do. The name was coined by an anonymous Rwandan propagandist in Note Relative à la Propagande d’Expansion et de Recrutement. Drawing on the ideas of Joseph Goebbels and Vladimir Lenin, he instructed colleagues to "impute  to  enemies  exactly  what  they  and  their  own  party  are  planning  to  do". By invoking collective self-defense, propaganda justifies genocide, just as self-defense is a defense for individual homicide. Susan Benesch remarked that while dehumanization "makes  genocide  seem  acceptable", accusation in a mirror makes it seem necessary.

Kenneth L. Marcus writes that the tactic is "similar to a false anticipatory tu quoque" (a logical fallacy which charges the opponent with hypocrisy).  The tactic does not rely on what misdeeds the enemy could plausibly be charged with, based on actual culpability or stereotypes, and does not involve any exaggeration but instead is an exact mirror of the perpetrator's own intentions. The weakness of the strategy is that it reveals the perpetrator's intentions, perhaps  before he is able to carry it out. This could enable intervention to prevent genocide, or alternatively be "an indispensable tool for identifying and prosecuting incitement". According to Marcus, despite its weaknesses the tactic is frequently used by genocide perpetrators (including Nazis, Serbs, and Hutus) because it is effective. He recommends that courts should consider a false accusation of genocide by an opposing group to satisfy the "direct" requirement, because that is an "almost invariable harbinger of genocide".

Euphemism and metaphor
Perpetrators often rely on euphemisms or metaphors to conceal their actions. During the Rwandan genocide, calls to "go to work" referred to the murder of Tutsis. In Prosecutor v. Nyiramasuhuko, et al. (2015), two defendants had asked others to "sweep the dirt outside". The Trial Chamber of the International Criminal Tribunal for Rwanda (ICTR) held that this was incitement to genocide, because listeners "understood the words ... 'sweeping dirt', to mean they needed to kill Tutsis". Similarly, in Nazi Germany euphemisms such as Final Solution, special treatment, and "resettlement to the East" were used to refer to mass murder. According to William Schabas, "The history of genocide shows that those who incite the crime speak in euphemisms."

Justification

Justifying ongoing atrocities may be considered incitement to genocide. For example, Nazi propagandists repeatedly emphasized to potential perpetrators that "massacres, torture, death marches, slavery, and other atrocities" were  carried out in a "humane" way. According to W. Michael Reisman, "in many of the most hideous international crimes, many of the individuals who are directly responsible operate within a cultural universe that inverts our morality and elevates their actions to the highest form of group, tribe, or national defense".

Praising past violence

Praising the perpetrators of completed atrocities can be a form of incitement. RTLM announcer Georges Ruggiu thanked the "valiant combatants" supposedly fighting a "battle" against Tutsi civilians. Eliézer Niyitegeka, transport minister, thanked militias for their "good work".

Asking questions
In the Rwandan genocide, Simon Bikindi's loudspeaker broadcasts to militia asking "have you killed the Tutsis here?" were held to contribute to a finding of incitement to genocide.

Conditional advocacy
In January 1994, Hassan Ngeze wrote an article stating that if Tutsi militias attacked, there would be "none of them left in Rwanda, not even a single accomplice. All the Hutu are united". The ICTR found that this was incitement to genocide, even though it was conditional.

Target–sympathizer conflation
During genocide, members of the majority group who help or sympathize with the targeted group are also persecuted. For example, during the Holocaust, non-Jews who hid Jews or simply opposed the genocide were murdered. In Rwanda, Hutus who opposed the genocide were labeled "traitors" and murdered. Mahmoud Ahmadinejad also threatened sympathizers with Israel, stating "Anybody who recognizes Israel will burn in the fire of the Islamic nation's fury".

Causing genocide

According to Susan Benesch, the strongest evidence for a causal connection between incitement and genocide is found in cases where there is widespread civilian participation in killings (as in Rwanda or the Nazi Holocaust) and where the target group lives alongside a majority group, requiring the acquiescence of that group for genocide to occur. Frank Chalk and Kurt Jonassohn wrote that "in order to perform a genocide  the  perpetrator  has  always  had  to  first  organize  a  campaign  that redefined the victim group as worthless, outside the web of mutual obligations,  a  threat  to  the  people,  immoral  sinners,  and/or  subhuman."

Larry May argues that incitement to genocide is proof of genocidal intent, and that inciters (along with planners) are more responsible for the resulting genocide than mere participants in the killing. He believes that incitement should be prosecuted more harshly than non-leadership participation for this reason, and because "the crime in question is not merely the individual act of killing or harming, but rather the mass crime of intending to destroy a protected group."

History

Armenian genocide
During the Armenian genocide, Ottoman propaganda described Armenians as "traitors, saboteurs, spies, conspirators, vermin, and infidels". At a meeting of the Committee of Union and Progress in February 1915, a speaker argued that "It is absolutely necessary to eliminate the Armenian people in its entirety, so that there is no further Armenian on this earth and the very concept of Armenia is extinguished." The party "envisioned the Armenian as an invasive infection in Muslim Turkish society", and CUP propagandist Ziya Gökalp promoted the idea that "Turkey could only be revitalized if it rid itself of its non-Muslim elements". This propaganda led directly to the murder of over a million Armenians.

The Holocaust

Gordon identifies three strategies that the Nazi leadership employed in order to spread hate propaganda about Jews: statements by Nazi leaders, the Ministry of Propaganda, and destruction of the independent press. American historian Jeffrey Herf has argued that the role of euphemisms in Nazi propaganda has been exaggerated, and in fact Nazi leaders often made direct threats against Jews.  The German dictator Adolf Hitler was the most important Nazi propagandist. His speeches and statements against the Jews were broadcast on the radio and reprinted on the front pages of the party newspaper Völkischer Beobachter, as well as other major newspapers. Goebbels' Ministry of Propaganda achieved "wholesale control of the mass media", and from 4 October 1933, all independent media was required to report to Otto Dietrich's Reich League of the German Press, which fined or censored newspaper editors who failed to follow Nazi ideology.

According to Nazi propaganda, an international Jewish conspiracy controlled the Allies and started World War II to "Bolshevize" the world; Germany fought back with a "war against the Jews". Nazi propagandists repeatedly accused "international Jewry" of plotting the extermination or annihilation of the German people and threatened to do the same to the Jews. As evidence, the obscure self-published American book Germany Must Perish!, which advocated the compulsory sterilization of all Germans, was repeatedly emphasized in Nazi propaganda. Hitler's prophecy, found in a 1939 speech which blamed Jews for the war and predicted their annihilation in that event, was frequently quoted during the killings of Jews and was another means of arguing for genocide.  Jews inside Europe were presented as a fifth column and saboteurs who posed a serious threat to the German war effort, even as mass deportations to extermination camps were ongoing.

Another tactic used to incite genocide against Jews was to portray them as subhumans. According to Nazi propaganda, Jews were "parasites, plague, cancer, tumour, bacillus, bloodsucker, blood poisoner, lice, vermin, bedbugs, fleas and racial tuberculosis" on the German national community, which was allegedly threatened by "Jewish disease". Goebbels described Jews as "the  lice  of  civilized  humanity". Nazi jurist Walter Buch wrote in the legal journal Deutsche Justiz: "the National  Socialist  has  recognized...[that]  the  Jew  is  not  a  human  being". By excluding Jews from humanity, it became justified to kill them.

The Grand Mufti of Jerusalem and Nazi collaborator Amin al-Husseini has also been described as inciting genocide, stating in a 1944 radio address for Bosnian Muslims, "Kill the Jews wherever you find them. This pleases God, history, and religion."

Bosnian genocide

In 1991, the state of Yugoslavia (which had consisted of Serbs, Croats, Bosniaks, Slovenes, Albanians, Slavic Macedonians, and Montenegrins) broke apart and fell into ethnic violence, which began with the secession of Croatia and Slovenia from the Serbian-led government in Belgrade. Bosnia-Herzegovina, an ethnically divided region with a plurality of Bosniaks as well as large Serbian and Croatian minorities, declared independence in March 1992. Serbs in Bosnia were represented by Serb Democratic Party (SDS), whose leader, Radovan Karadžić, had already threatened Bosniaks with genocide: supporting independence "might lead Bosnia into a hell and [cause] one people to disappear". Serbs did not recognize Bosnian independence and instead started the Bosnian War. Serbian forces committed many war crimes during the conflict, which included ethnic cleansing of non-Serbs, mass rapes, imprisonment in internment camps and the Srebrenica massacre.

Alongside the Serb military campaign, there was also a Serb propaganda campaign which aimed to instill "mutual fear and hatred and particularly inciting the Bosnian Serb population against the other ethnicities", according to the judgement in Prosecutor v. Brđanin. Because of the propaganda, people who had lived peacefully together turned against each other and became murderers. In 1991, Wolves of Vučjak and other Serb militia groups helped the SDS seize control of the TV stations, which were subsequently used for pro-Serb propaganda. According to this propaganda, which became more virulent as the war continued, Bosniaks and Croats would commit genocide against the Serbs unless they were eliminated first. The most extreme broadcasts, according to Brđanin, "openly incited people to kill non-Serbs".

Rwandan genocide

Incitement to genocide attracted attention due to its occurrence prior to and during the Rwandan genocide in 1994. The pro-genocide media, especially RTLM, was referred to as "radio genocide", "death by radio" and "the soundtrack to genocide", and its causative role was recognized by international commentators. Rwanda, a former Belgian colony, included Hutu (84%) and Tutsi (15%) populations. Under colonial rule, Tutsi were favored to the exclusion of Hutus, leading to a buildup of ethnic resentment. After majority rule began in 1962, Hutus unleashed violence against Tutsis which led many of the latter to flee to neighboring countries. In 1987, these exiles created Rwandan Patriotic Front (RPF), which invaded Rwanda in 1990. In 1993, international pressure caused the Hutu government under Juvénal Habyarimana to sign the Arusha Accords with the RPF, but Hutu hardliners took to the media to denounce the agreement, Belgium, and Tutsis.

The state-controlled Radio Rwanda was taken over by Hutu extremists for broadcasting hate propaganda.  A tabloid newspaper, Kangura, was also responsible for incitement, juxtaposing a picture of a machete with the question "What shall we do to complete the social revolution of 1959?" At Ferdinand Nahimana's behest, in 1992  Radio Rwanda broadcast a fabricated "hit list" supposedly drawn up by Tutsis as Hutu militias were being bussed to the target area. The militiamen killed hundreds of Tutsi civilians in the Bugesera massacres, which proved to be a "dress rehearsal" for the 100 days of murder that began in April 1994. Also in 1992, Léon Mugesera called for Tutsi to be sent "back to Ethiopia" via the non-navigable Nyabarongo River, which had been previously used to dispose of the bodies of Tutsis murdered in ethnic violence. The Rwandan Minister of Justice soon filed incitement charges against him, causing Mugesera to flee to Canada. After Nahimana was sacked from Radio Rwanda due to his role in the Bugesera massacres, he and others set up a private radio station, RTLM, which played the key role in inciting the genocide. Gordon describes four categories of RTLM broadcasts before the genocide. The first type criticized Tutsis based on alleged characteristics (such as wealth, similar to antisemitism, or physical traits). Another type of broadcast generalized all Tutsis as "inyenzi" (cockroaches) and Inkotanyi, a dangerous feudal warrior. The RTLM also acknowledged its reputation for inciting racial hatred, and denounced specific Tutsis (on 3 April, a doctor in Cyangugu was mentioned in a broadcast; he was murdered on 6 April.)

The genocide began on 6 April 1994 with the assassination of Habyarimana, whose plane was shot down over Kigali. Hutu extremists organized death squads which assassinated Tutsi and moderate Hutu politicians. A unit of Belgian peacekeepers were also murdered, in order to encourage the UN to withdraw its peacekeeping mission.

Hamas

Hamas, an Islamist Palestinian militant group that has controlled the Gaza Strip since 2007, has fired thousands of rockets indiscriminately into Israeli civilian areas and orchestrated a suicide bombing campaign aimed at Israeli civilians. Several statements by Hamas officials have been described as incitement to genocide.

Iran

Since the 1979 Islamic Revolution, Iran is controlled by an Islamic government. Iran has attempted to develop nuclear weapons and uses proxy terrorism (via Hamas, Hezbollah, and Islamic Jihad) to attack and threaten Israeli civilians.  Incendiary statements calling for the destruction of Israel are common in Iranian politics. President Mahmoud Ahmadinejad has called for Israel to be "wiped Israel off the map". Gregory Gordon and some other legal scholars contend that Ahmadinejad is guilty of incitement to genocide, although Benesch disagrees. In December 2006, the Conference of Presidents of Major American Jewish Organizations and the Jerusalem Center for Public Affairs hosted a symposium "Bring Ahmadinejad to Justice For Incitement to Genocide". The resulting petition, authored by Irwin Colter, has been signed by Elie Wiesel, Former UN High Commissioner for Human Rights Louise Arbour, and the former Swedish Deputy Prime Minister Per Ahlmark, and historian Yehuda Bauer. In 2007, the United States House of Representatives passed a resolution calling on Ahmadinejad to be investigated for inciting genocide.

Islamic State

The Islamic State (IS) has incited genocide against Yazidi people by dehumanizing them as "Satanists" and "devil worshippers" and issuing fatwas which recommend the sexual slavery of Yazidi women. According to IS propaganda, Yazidis' "continual existence to this day is a matter that Muslims should question as they will be asked about it on Judgement Day." Mohamed Elewa Badar argues IS has incited genocide, not just against Yazidis but against all those deemed kafir (infidels) in their extremist interpretation of Islam. IS advocates the "partial or total eradication of non-Muslim groups", and has committed genocide against the Yazidis.

International treaties
Based on the precedent of Nazi propagandist Julius Streicher, who was convicted of crimes against humanity by the International Military Tribunal in 1946, "[d]irect and public incitement to commit genocide" was forbidden by the Genocide Convention (1948), Article 3.  During the debate on the convention, the Soviet delegate argued that "[i]t was impossible that hundreds of thousands of people should commit so many crimes unless they had been incited to do so" and that inciters, "the ones really responsible for the atrocities committed", ought to face justice. Several delegates supported a provision that would criminalize hate propaganda even if it did not directly call for violence. The Secretariat Draft called for the criminalization of "[a]ll forms of public propaganda tending by their systematic and hateful character to provoke genocide, or tending to make it appear as a necessary, legitimate or excusable act". However, the United States was reluctant to criminalize genocide incitement due to concerns over freedom of the press, and opposed any provisions that were seen as overly broad and likely to infringe on freedom of speech.

The International Convention on the Elimination of All Forms of Racial Discrimination (1965) prohibits "all dissemination of ideas based on racial superiority or hatred, incitement to racial discrimination, as well as all acts of violence or incitement to such acts against any race or group of persons of another colour or ethnic origin". One of the most widely ratified treaties, International Covenant on Civil and Political Rights (1966) also prohibits "propaganda for war" and "advocacy of national, racial or religious hatred that constitutes incitement to discrimination, hostility or violence" (which arguably conflicts with a separate article calling for freedom of speech). However, according to Wilson, many countries signed these treaties to maintain a façade of respect for human rights while violating their provisions and there is little effective international enforcement of human rights outside of the European Court of Human Rights. No more trials for incitement to genocide were held until nearly fifty years after the ratification of the Genocide Convention.

Since 1998, incitement to genocide is also forbidden by Article 25(3)(e) of the Rome Statute of the International Criminal Court. According to the Rome Statue, incitement is not "a crime in its own right" and an inchoate offense, as it was considered in previous prosecutions, but simply one possible "mode of criminal participation in genocide". Thomas Davies contends that this change makes it less likely that a perpetrator will be held accountable for incitement.

Case law

Nuremberg trials

Julius Streicher, the founder, editor, and publisher of Der Stürmer, was found responsible for antisemitic articles referring to Jews as "a parasite, an enemy, and an evil-doer, a disseminator of diseases" or "swarms of locusts which must be exterminated completely". He continued to publish antisemitic articles even after learning of the mass murder of Jews in the occupied Soviet Union. The prosecution argued that "Streicher helped to create, through his propaganda, the psychological basis necessary for carrying through a program of persecution which culminated in the murder of six million men, women, and children." Because Streicher's articles "incited  the  German  people  to  active persecution" and "murder and extermination", he was convicted of crimes against humanity by the IMT in 1946.

Hans Fritzsche was the Chief of the German Press Division of Joseph Goebbels' Reich Ministry of Public Enlightenment and Propaganda from 1938; in this position he issued instructions to German newspapers telling them what to report. According to the IMT prosecution, he "incited and encouraged the commission of War Crimes by deliberately falsifying news to arouse in the German People those passions which led them to the commission of atrocities". Fritzsche was acquitted because the court was "not  prepared  to  hold  that  [his  broadcasts]  were  intended  to incite  the  German  people  to  commit  atrocities  on  conquered  peoples". Nuremberg prosecutor Alexander Hardy later said that evidence not available to the prosecution at the time proved Fritzsche not only knew of the extermination of European Jews but also "played an important part in bringing [Nazi crimes] about", and would have resulted in his conviction. Fritzsche was later classified as Group I (Major Offenders) by a denazification court which gave him the maximum penalty, eight years' imprisonment.

Otto Dietrich was not tried at the main Nuremberg trial, but was convicted of crimes against humanity at the Ministries Trial, one of the subsequent Nuremberg trials. According to Hardy, Dietrich "more than anyone else, was responsible for presenting to the German people the justification for liquidating the Jews". Hardy noted that Dietrich not only controlled Der Stürmer but another 3,000 newspapers and 4,000 periodicals with a combined circulation over 30 million. The judgement against him noted that he conducted "a well thought-out, oft-repeated, persistent campaign to arouse the hatred of the German people against Jews" despite the lack of direct calls for violence made by him.

International Criminal Tribunal for Rwanda

The ICTR indicted three people for incitement to genocide in the so-called Rwanda Media Case: Hassan Ngeze, Ferdinand Nahimana, and Jean-Bosco Barayagwiza. All were convicted. The judges asserted that "The power of the media to create and destroy fundamental human values comes with great responsibility. Those who control such media are accountable for its consequences". They noted that "Without a firearm, machete or any physical weapon, you caused the deaths of thousands of innocent civilians". Prosecutors were able to prove that "direct" calls to genocide were made despite the use of euphemisms such as "go to work" for murdering Tutsi. After an appeal, the conviction of Barayagwiza was vacated because he had not been in control of the media while the genocide was occurring. However, Barayagwiza was still guilty of "instigating the perpetration of acts of genocide" and crimes against humanity.

International Criminal Tribunal for the former Yugoslavia

The ICTY has focused on prosecuting crimes other than genocide, because it is believed that the hate speech that occurred during the Bosnian genocide did not meet the legal standard of incitement to genocide. Serb politician Vojislav Šešelj was indicted for crimes against humanity, including "war propaganda and incitement of hatred  towards  non-Serb  people". Serbian politician Radovan Karadžić was convicted of "participating in a joint criminal enterprise to commit crimes against humanity on the basis of his public speeches and broadcasts". Dario Kordić and Radoslav Brđanin were also convicted of crimes based on instigating violence in public speeches.

National case law
In 2016, Léon Mugesera was convicted of incitement to genocide and inciting ethnic hatred by a Rwandan court based on his 1992 speech.

Countering incitement

Inclusion of incitement in the Genocide Convention was intended to prevent genocide. As the judgement of Prosecutor v. Kalimanzira  stated, "The inchoate nature of the crime allows intervention at an earlier stage, with the goal of preventing the occurrence of genocidal acts." Irwin Cotler stated that efforts to enforce the Genocide Convention in inchoate incitement cases "have proven manifestly inadequate". Alternately, prosecution for incitement after the genocide had concluded could have deterrent effect on those planning to commit the crime, but the effectiveness of international criminal trials as a deterrent is disputed. However, deterrence is less effective when the definition of the crime is contested and undefined.

Besides prosecutions, non-judicial interventions (called "information intervention") is possible against incitement, such as jamming broadcasting frequencies used to disseminate incitement or broadcasting counterspeech advocating against genocide. Genocide-inciting social media accounts and websites (such as those used by Islamic State to spread propaganda) can be shut down and taken offline. However, propagandists can circumvent these methods by creating new accounts or moving to a different hosting service. As an alternative to outright censorship, Google developed a "Redirect Method" which identifies individuals searching for IS-related material and redirects them to content which challenges IS narratives.

See also

Eliminationism
Incitement to terrorism
Hate media

Notes

References

Sources

External links

 Incitement to genocide case law—Case Law Database
 Incitement on Trial: Prosecuting International Speech Crimes: A Conversation with Richard Ashby Wilson, Linda Lakhdhir, Marko Milanovic and Nadine Strossen (November 8, 2017) Open Society Foundations

 
Genocide
Hate speech
Inchoate offenses
Speech crimes